The Wildlands Conservancy (TWC) is a nonprofit organization whose mission is to preserve land for public recreation.  It operates 23 preserves in California and Oregon.  The preserve system comprises 210,686 acres including mountains, valleys, deserts, rivers and oceanfront lands.  TWC buys land, restores land, builds public visitor facilities and provides outdoor education programs for children.  All usage (hiking, camping, education programs) is free of charge.  There are over 1 million visitors annually.

Preserve System Summary

History
The California Desert Protection Act of 1994 established two national parks, one national preserve and 69 wilderness areas.  Significant private inholdings existed within these public lands.

In 1995, TWC acquired a 25,500 acre inholding of San Gorgonio Wilderness and created Pioneertown Mountains Preserve.

In 1998, most private inholdings within the California desert preserves were put up for sale.  TWC launched a campaign to preserve this land.  From 1999-2003 TWC acquired 646,000 acres of these inholdings and gifted it to government agencies.

From 1995 to 2000, TWC created preserves in Southern California.  These preserves are located in the San Bernardino Mountains, nearby desert canyons and the southern central valley.

In 2005 TWC acquired a historic trout hatchery, restored the land, and created Whitewater Preserve providing access to San Gorgonio Wilderness.

From 2005 to 2009, TWC expanded into Northern California creating preserves along the Eel River and Sonoma Coast.

The California Desert Protection Act of 2010 extended desert preservation.

In 2016, President Obama designated Sand to Snow National Monument, Mojave Trails National Monument, and Castle Mountains National Monument.
Sand to Snow National Monument contains Whitewater Preserve and Mission Creek Preserve.
 

Mojave Trails National Monument contains large amounts of land acquired by TWC and donated to the federal government.

From 2015 to 2021, TWC added preserves throughout California including several in the eastern Sierra Nevada.

In 2022, a preserve was established in Oregon, the first outside California.

Preserves

References

Bibliography

External links
 

Land trusts in California
Environmental organizations based in California
1995 establishments in California